The 1878–79 Home Nations rugby union matches are a series of international friendlies held between the England, Ireland and Scotland national rugby union teams. The only recognised competition held between the countries was the inaugural Calcutta Cup match, contested between England and Scotland. It was the first challenge for the Cup, and ended in an unspectacular draw.

Results

Scoring system
The matches for this season were decided on goals scored. A goal was awarded for a successful conversion after a try, for a dropped goal or for a goal from mark. If a game was drawn, any unconverted tries were tallied to give a winner. If there was still no clear winner, the match was declared a draw.

The matches

Ireland vs. Scotland

Ireland: RB Walkington, T Harrison, JC Bagot, RN Matier, AM Whitestone, WJ Goulding, WEA Cummins, AM Archer, HC Kelly, W Finaly, JA McDonald, JW Taylor, WC Neville capt., G Scriven, H Purdon

Scotland: Bill Maclagan, Malcolm Cross, Ninian Finlay, WH Masters, James Campbell, Robert Ainslie, DR Irvine, JB Brown, D. Somerville, RW Irvine capt., AG Petrie, JHS Graham, Henry Melville Napier, NT Brewis, ER Smith

Scotland vs. England

Scotland: Bill Maclagan, Malcolm Cross, Ninian Finlay, John Alexander Neilson, James Campbell, Robert Ainslie, Duncan Irvine, JB Brown, EN Ewart, RW Irvine capt., AG Petrie, JHS Graham, Henry Melville Napier, NT Brewis, JE Junor

England: WJ Penny, H Huth (Huddersfield), L Stokes, WAD Evanson, HH Taylor, HH Springman, S Neame, Frank Reginald Adams capt., FD Fowler, A Budd, G Harrison (Hull), George Burton, HC Rowley, Roger Walker, NF McLeod

England vs. Ireland

England: WJ Penny, WAD Evanson, L Stokes, HT Twynam, WE Openshaw, Harold Dingwall Bateson, S Neame, Frank Reginald Adams capt:, JM Biggs, A Budd, G Harrison (Hull), GW Burton, HC Rowley, Edward Temple Gurdon, NF McLeod

Ireland: WW Pike, WJ Willis, JC Bagot, J Heron, AM Whistestone, BN Casement, JR Bristow, F Schute, HW Murray, W Finaly, JJ Keon, JL Cuppaidge, WC Neville capt., G Scriven, H Purdon

Bibliography

References

History of rugby union matches between England and Scotland
History of rugby union matches between England and Ireland
History of rugby union matches between Ireland and Scotland
England national rugby union team matches
Scotland national rugby union team matches
Ireland national rugby union team matches
1878–79 in British rugby union
1879 in English sport
1879 in Scottish sport
rugby union